Arthur Robinson may refer to:

A. N. R. Robinson (Arthur Napoleon Raymond Robinson, 1926–2014), Prime Minister and President of Trinidad and Tobago
Arthur Robinson (Australian politician) (1872–1945)
Arthur Robinson, character in 55 Days at Peking

United States 
Art Robinson (born 1942), American biochemist and Republican candidate for the United States House of Representatives
Arthur G. Robinson (born 1936), American bridge player
Arthur H. Robinson (1915–2004), American geographer and cartographer
Arthur J. Robinson (1943–2018), known as Mr. Okra, fruit vendor
Arthur P. Robinson (1879–1944), American football coach and businessman
Arthur Raymond Robinson (1881–1961), American politician from the state of Indiana
Arthur Neal Robinson (1886–1958), architect in Atlanta, Georgia

Europe 
Arthur Robinson (anatomist) (1862–1948), British anatomist
Arthur Robinson (cricketer, born 1855) (1855–1913), English cricketer for Gloucestershire
Arthur Robinson (civil servant) (1876–1950), English civil servant
Arthur Robinson (Irish cricketer) (1899–1937), Irish cricketer
Arthur Robinson (cricketer, born 1946) (born 1946), English cricketer for Yorkshire
Arthur W. Robinson (1880–?), English cricketer
Arthur Leyland Robinson (1888–1959), British physician
Arthur Robinson (rugby union) (1865–1948), rugby union footballer of the 1890s for England, and Blackheath F.C.